Kisay Chahoon (lit: Whom Should I Choose?) is a Pakistani television series that premiered on Hum TV on February 3, 2016. It is directed by Ahmed Bhatti, written by Mehwish Hassan and produced by Moomal Qazi Shunaid.

Plot

Summary 
The drama revolves around the life of a young girl, Mehru (Soniya Hussain) who is in love with her cousin Hamza (Noor Hassan). Mehru has to marry Ameer (Ali Abbas), and Hamza marries Marina Zaman (Iqra Aziz), the daughter of his boss Zaman (Manzoor Qureshi).

Cast
 Soniya Hussain as Mehru Ameer
 Noor Hassan Rizvi as Hamza
 Ali Abbas as Amir Jamal
 Iqra Aziz as Marina Zaman
 Firdous Jamal as Jabbar Ahmed
 Manzoor Qureshi as Zaman
 Shaheen Khan as Shakira 
 Nusrat Jahan
 Rubina Arif as Marina's mother	
 Pari Hashmi as Maryam
 Fouzia Mushtaq as Zakkiya

Production 
Talking about the drama serial, Sonya told Brandsynario, "The play is about a struggle of a young girl with herself as she has to choose between two guys – a man who gives her respect and love and in return doesn’t demand anything. On the other hand, there is someone whose company she thoroughly enjoys and can’t think of living without him."

See also
 2016 in Pakistani television 
 List of programs broadcast by Hum TV

References

External links
 
 Moomel Entertainment

Hum TV original programming
Pakistani telenovelas
Serial drama television series
Television series created by Momina Duraid
Urdu-language television shows
Television series set in the 2010s
Television series set in Hyderabad, Sindh
2016 Pakistani television series debuts
2016 Pakistani television series endings